Bruno Alexander Spoerri  (born 16 August 1935) is a Swiss jazz and electronics musician.

Born in Zurich, he studied applied psychology in Basel and Zurich. He played the saxophone as a student, and toured with the Modern Jazz Group Freiburg in Germany and Switzerland. In the early 1960s, he worked as a psychologist and career counsellor. He experimented with electrified saxophone and published the album Voice of Taurus in 1978.

Discography 
 Jazz-Rock Experience (Deram, 1970)
 Glückskugel (Finders Keepers Records, 1971–1980)
 Container (1976)
 Voice of Taurus (Gold Records/Inzec 1978)
 AX+BY+CZ+D=0 (1983)
 Zürich Tenors (FFO 1983, with Ernst Gerber, Fernando Fantini, Richard Lipiec, Umberto Foletti, Rolf Cizmek, Hans Brunner)
 Albert Mangelsdorff - Bruno Spoerri - Christy Doran - Reto Weber: Shake, Shuttle and Blow (Enja, 1999)

 Awards 
 Jazz Festival Zürich 1954: First Prize for Saxophone and Band
 Jazz Festival Düsseldorf (Deutschland) 1956: Second Prize for Alto Saxophone with Modern Jazz Group Freiburg
 Jazz Festival Zürich 1958: First Prize for Bigband
 International Advertising Film Festival Cannes 1965: First Prize for TV-Spot Bic (Produktion Televico)
 American TV and Radio Commercials Festival 1971: Clio for TV-Spot Riri 1973 Filmpreis der Stadt Zürich
 1979 First prize in Ars Electronica Linz for Demonstration of Lyricon
 1992 Featured Guest Composer bei der International Computer Music Conference'' San José

Further reading 
  CD-accessory to: 
  CD-accessory to:

References

External links 
 
 

1935 births
Living people
Jazz saxophonists
Swiss film score composers
Male film score composers
Swiss record producers
Swiss jazz musicians
21st-century saxophonists
21st-century male musicians
Male jazz musicians